The King of the Sea (original title: Il re del mare) is an exotic adventure novel written by Italian author Emilio Salgari, published in 1906. It features his most famous character, Sandokan.

Plot introduction

Malaysia, 1868. A mysterious figure has armed the Dyaks and led them into battle against Tremal-Naik. Yanez De Gomera races to the rescue but soon learns that Sandokan and his Tigers are also under threat. Despite eleven years of peace, the new Rajah of Sarawak, James Brooke's nephew, has ordered the pirates to leave their island home or face all out war. Is this the end for the Tigers of Mompracem?

See also

Novels in the Sandokan Series:
The Mystery of the Black Jungle
The Tigers of Mompracem
The Pirates of Malaysia
The Two Tigers
Quest for a Throne

Novels in The Black Corsair series 
The Black Corsair
The Queen of the Caribbean
Son of the Red Corsair

External links
Read the first chapter.
Read a review of the Sandokan series at SFSite.com.
Read a review at Pirates and Privateers.
Read a Sandokan Biography.
Read about the historical Sandokan.
Italy’s enduring love affair with Emilio Salgari, The Economist, June 2017

1906 novels
Novels by Emilio Salgari
Fiction set in 1868
Novels set in the 1860s
20th-century Italian novels
Italian adventure novels